Term Life is a 2016 American action drama film based on the graphic novel of the same name. It is directed by Peter Billingsley from a screenplay by A.J. Lieberman. The film stars Vince Vaughn, who also produces the film, Hailee Steinfeld, Jonathan Banks, Mike Epps, Jordi Molla, Shea Whigham, William Levy, Taraji P. Henson, Annabeth Gish, and Terrence Howard. The film was released on April 29, 2016, in a limited release and through video on demand by Focus World. The film received negative reviews.

It was the final film role appearance of Brent Briscoe, who died on October 18, 2017.

Plot
Nick Barrow plans and sells heists to the highest bidder but is forced to take his daughter Cate, who he hasn't had a relationship with her whole life, on the lam when a job goes bad. Cate has had to fend for herself because her mother Lucy is an alcoholic. Cate gives her father a hard time because his criminal activity has now disrupted her life. Nick is trying to connect the dots and hunt down who double-crossed him. With the aid of an elderly man Harper, he gets the inside scoop and comes to the conclusion that it was an undercover officer Captain Keenan who is out to kill Nick.

In the meantime, Nick and Cate bond and she asks how he does his heists: "learn how to get out before you get in, evaluate the security of a location, whether they have CCTV or the owner is the one that responds, and always make sure to have a workable exit plan." Cate was initially irritated that her father knows so much about her and has taken pictures of her throughout her life and has kept it in a box but she also enjoys the birthday gift he gets for her, taking her to the carnival and teaching her how to shoot. Keenan now needs to clean up his corrupt team who is ratting him out to Internal Affairs and kills Detective Matty and a hooker and fingers Nick as the guy who did the killing.

Hunted by mob bosses, contract killers and dirty cops, he takes out a life insurance policy on himself to leave something for her. Nick educates Cate on how to separate and survive. In the meantime, Nick gets arrested by the local sheriff responding to an APB and the Spanish mob springs him out of jail to kill him but Cate comes to the rescue. Cate and Nick argue and Cate abandons Nick on the side of the road. Keenan abducts Cate and uses her as bait to try to get Nick and in the shoot-out, Nick and Cate escape. Even though Nick was unwilling to listen to Cate's plan, Cate executed a plan that got rid of Keenan, evidence pointed to him for multiple murders and exonerated Nick, and Nick and Cate choose to live together and bond as father and daughter.

Cast

Production
Production came to an abrupt halt when Universal decided to cancel the film in October 2013, just a month after casting Hailee Steinfeld. The film was then revived a month later by QED International and PalmStar Entertainment, who co-financed and produced the film with Universal on board to handle U.S. distribution. Filming began on March 1, 2014, with a casting call issued in Grantville, Georgia, and concluded on April 22, 2014.

Release
Originally Universal Pictures was set to distribute the film. However, Focus World ended up getting distribution rights to the film. The film was originally scheduled to be released on March 1, 2016, through video on demand, prior to opening in a limited release on April 8, 2016. However, it was delayed to April 29, 2016, with the film opening in a limited release and through video on demand.

Reception
The film received a score of 0% on Rotten Tomatoes based on 7 reviews.

Noel Murray of the Los Angeles Times wrote: "Term Life is cleanly plotted and tautly paced, but it's never as fun as it should be."

References

External links
 
 

2016 films
2016 crime thriller films
American crime thriller films
WWE Studios films
Films directed by Peter Billingsley
Films shot in Atlanta
Films shot in Georgia (U.S. state)
Films based on Image Comics
2010s English-language films
2010s American films